The Grigorovich MK-1 (MK - Morskoi Kreiser - sea cruiser) was a large trimotor floatplane, built and tested in Imperial Russia in 1916.

Design and development
Grigorovich responded to a requirement for a reconnaissance-bomber, for use in the Baltic Sea and Black Sea, issued by the Imperial Russian Navy central headquarters. The resulting large seaplane following the layout of the Sikorsky Ilya Muromets, with a large glazed cabin sitting atop a long slender fuselage. The fuselage and large wings were mounted on a large central float, which also housed a large gunners cockpit housing two gunners. Two  Renault 12E V-12 water-cooled engines were mounted in strut-supported nacelles between the upper and lower mainplanes. A third engine was added to the centre section of the upper mainplane, to address perceived centre-of-gravity problems and increase the power available; initially this was to have been a  Sunbeam Crusader, later replaced by a  Hispano-Suiza 8A before flight trials commenced. 

The sole MK-1 was readied for flight trials in mid-November 1916 but nosed over and sank during taxy trials before the first flight.

Specifications (MK-1)

References

Bibliography

External links
 Russian Aviation Museum clone 
 Russian Aviation Museum

MK-1
Flying boats
Biplanes